Platysmacheilus nudiventris is a species of cyprinid endemic to the upper reaches of the Yangtze in China.

References

Platysmacheilus
Fish described in 1977